The Yuwen ( < Eastern Han Chinese: *waB-mun < Old Chinese *waʔ-mən) is a Chinese compound surname originated from a pre-state clan of Xianbei ethnicity of Xiongnu origin during the era of Sixteen Kingdoms in China, until its destruction by Former Yan's prince Murong Huang in 345.  Among the eastern Xianbei clans that ranged from the central part of the present day Liaoning province and eastward, Yuwen clan was the largest, and was awarded the position of the leader of eastern Xianbei (東部大人) by Chinese rulers.  A descendant of the Yuwen tribe, Yuwen Tai, established the Northern Zhou Dynasty in the 6th century.

Yuwen were descendants of the nomadic Xiongnu who became assimilated with the Xianbei after 89 CE and ruled the Kumo Xi and Khitan (both Mongolic peoples) before being defeated by Murong Huang in 344 CE, upon which Yuwen separated from the Kumo Xi and Khitan. The language of the Yuwen is thought to be Turkic or a very distant branch of Mongolic.

People with this surname
 Yuwen Tai, paramount general of the Chinese/Xianbei state Western Wei
 Yuwen Jue, First Emperor of Northern Zhou
 Yuwen Yu, Second Emperor of Northern Zhou
 Yuwen Yong, Third Emperor of Northern Zhou
 Yuwen Yun, Fourth Emperor of Northern Zhou
 Yuwen Yan, Fifth and Last Emperor of Northern Zhou
 Yuwen Huaji, general of the Sui Dynasty 
 Yuwen Rong, official and Chancellor of the Tang Dynasty, 
 Yuwen Jie, official and Chancellor of the Tang Dynasty,
 Yuwen Shu, official and general of the Sui Dynasty
 Yuwen Shiji, official of the Sui Dynasty and Chancellor of the Tang Dynasty
 Yuwen Xian, official and general of Northern Zhou
 Yuwen Hu, regent of the Xianbei dynasty Northern Zhou
 Yuwen Suo'an (宇文所安), the Chinese name of the sinologist Stephen Owen

Chieftains of the Yuwen

See also
Xianbei
Murong
Xiongnu
List of past Chinese ethnic groups
Wu Hu
Northern Zhou Dynasty
Jilin Yuwen High School

Notes

Manchuria
Ancient peoples of China
Xianbei
Individual Chinese surnames